Preston Bradley (1888 – June 1, 1983) was an American clergyman, author, and lecturer.  He believed that ethics, religion, and economics could not be separated. As a follower of Henry George, he believed that ministers must be concerned with social justice, poverty, and civic wrongs.  This liberal ideology guided his life and he was viewed as a forceful liberal voice and a reformer. He was the founder and pastor of the Peoples Church in the Uptown Neighborhood of Chicago. Bradley was a civic leader who was active in Chicago in many areas, such as conservation, arts, racial issues, and education.

Bradley was on the Chicago Public Library Board for over 25 years.  Preston Bradley Hall, in the former main location of the Chicago Public Library, now the Chicago Cultural Center, is named for him.

Early life and religious affiliations 
Bradley was born and raised in Linden, Michigan, in a conservative Christian home.  He attended Alma College and a Flint, Michigan law school. He worked as a weekend pastor while a student.  In 1911, he moved to Chicago to attend the conservative Moody Bible Institute.  After being ordained as a Presbyterian minister in 1912, he left the church saying, "I am not orthodox about anything. I am thoroughly, completely, adequately, gloriously and triumphantly a heretic." He rejected Christian orthodoxy and became a Christian Unitarian. From 1912 until the founding of the People's Church in 1922, Bradley conducted Sunday services at a number of Chicago theaters.

Peoples Church 
Peoples Church of Chicago called Bradley to be its pastor before 1914. He based his ministry on the creed of "the Good, the True and the Beautiful" and affiliating with the Unitarian Conference.  In 1926, the Church moved into its home at 941 W. Lawrence.  Bradley built the Church into a major Chicago institution with four thousand members.  His radio program reached millions of listeners. The Church continued to grow, adding new buildings.  It was "one of the most largely attended liberal churches in the world".  Bradley retired from the church in 1968, but continued to give sermons and radio programs until 1976.

Writer Irna Phillips, a lifelong Chicago resident, credited Bradley's radio sermons with inspiring her creation of the soap opera Guiding Light, which ran on radio and then on television for a total of 72 years.

Civic work and honorary degrees 
Bradley  served on the boards of the  Chicago Public Library, and the Illinois State Teachers College and Normal School. He was a founder and president of the Izaak Walton League (a conservation group), a charter member of the Chicago Human Relations Commission, and a trustee of the Municipal Art League.

Bradley was granted many honorary degrees:  a D.C.L. from Hamilton College of Law (Chicago, Illinois), an L.L.D. from Lake Forest College (Lake Forest, Illinois), and a D.D. from Meadville Theological Seminary (Chicago, Illinois).

Personal life 
Bradley married Grace Thayer in 1915.  She died in 1950.  Their adopted son, James, died in 1951.  Bradley married June Haslet in 1952.  (11 SPE) In 1976 he moved to Vermont, where he died June 1, 1983.

Works by Preston Bradley 
Bradley was a prolific speaker and writer. Many of his sermons, radio programs and other writings are held at the University of Illinois, Chicago.  A list is available.  Following is a list of his books:
 Along the Way:  An Autobiography.  New York:  McKay, 1962
 Between You and Me.  Chicago:  Aspley House, 1967
 Courage for Today. Indianapolis:  Bobbs-Merrill, 1934
 Happiness Through Creative Living.  Garden City, New York:  Hanover House, 1955
 Life and You.  New York, London:  Harper & Brothers, 1939
 Mastering Fear.  Indianapolis:  Bobbs-Merrill, 1935
 Meditations and My Daily Strength.  New York:  Permabooks,  1950
 New Wealth for You.  New York:  Stokes, 1941
 Power from Right Thinking.  Indianapolis:  Bobbs-Merrill, 1936
 Was Abraham Lincoln a Christian? Peoria, IL: Edward J. Jacob, 1949

References

External links
 

American Unitarians
1888 births
1983 deaths
People from Genesee County, Michigan
People from Chicago